Wife Number 13 (translit. Al Zouga talattashar) is a 1962 Egyptian film, written by Abo El Seoud El Ebiary and directed by Fatin Abdel Wahab. It was entered into the 12th Berlin International Film Festival.

Cast
 Shadia as Aida Saber Abdel Saboor
 Rushdy Abaza as Mourad Salem
 Abdel Moneim Ibrahim as Ibrahim
 Shwikar as Karima
 Hassan Fayek as Saber Abdel Saboor
 Widad Hamdy as Boumba

References

External links

1961 films
1961 comedy films
1960s Arabic-language films
Egyptian black-and-white films
Films directed by Fatin Abdel Wahab
Egyptian comedy films
1962 comedy films
1962 films